Liotomus is a genus of extinct mammal from the Paleocene epoch (early Cenozoic era). It lived in Europe and North America, and was a member of the extinct order Multituberculata, lying within the suborder Cimolodonta and possibly the family Cimolodontidae.

The genus Liotomus was named by E. D. Cope  in 1884. This genus is sometimes placed within family Eucosmodontidae (Jepsen 1940).

Species
Liotomus marshi (Lemoine, 1882)
 L. marshi remains are known from the Upper Paleocene of Cernay, France.
 L. marshi has been cited as a descendant of Anconodon gidleyi.
Liotomus vanvaleni
 L. vanvaleni remains are known from the San Juan Basin, New Mexico.

References 
 Cope (1884), "The Tertiary Marsupialia." American Naturalist, 18, p. 686-697.
 Sloan (1981), "Systematics of Paleocene multituberculates from the San Juan Basin, New Mexico," pp. 127–160, in Lucas et al. (eds), "Advances in San Juan Basin paleontology." University of New Mexico Press, Albuquerque.
 Kielan-Jaworowska Z & Hurum JH (2001), "Phylogeny and Systematics of multituberculate mammals." Paleontology 44, p. 389-429.

Ptilodontoids
Paleocene mammals
Paleocene genus extinctions
Prehistoric mammals of Europe
Prehistoric mammal genera